Sabot was a brief-lived underground newspaper published in Seattle, Washington by the Seattle Liberation Front from September 11, 1970 to January 13, 1971. Sixteen weekly issues were published in all. The paper was started as a replacement for the Seattle Helix which had published its last issue in June 1970. As with its predecessor, Sabot was from the beginning torn by political dissension within the radical political collective, centering on an internal struggle with feminists over issues of male chauvinism and editorial control and direction. After a few months the divided staff was no longer able to get an issue out and the newspaper quit publishing.

Contributors during its brief run included local underground cartoonist Shary Flenniken and radical feminist Susan Stern, who later published a candid and revealing memoir of her experiences, With the Weathermen, prior to her death in 1976.  Several former Sabot staff members later formed the Weatherman-influenced "George Jackson Brigade" collective in the greater Seattle area which ended in a bank robbery and shoot-out in Tukwila, Washington that killed former staffer Bruce Seidel and resulted in the capture of remaining members of the collective.

See also
Underground newspapers
Underground press
Seattle Weather Collective
 List of underground newspapers of the 1960s counterculture

References

Newspapers published in Seattle
Alternative weekly newspapers published in the United States
Defunct newspapers published in Washington (state)
Publications established in 1970
Publications disestablished in 1970